The De Britto Higher Secondary School is a private Catholic secondary school for boys located in Ramnagar, Devakottai, in the Sivagangai District of Tamil Nadu, India. The school was founded in 1943 by the Jesuits of the Madurai Province and is named after the Jesuit saint, John de Britto. The State Board school has cultural activities of Veeramamunivar Kalai Ilakkia Mandram.

The De Britto Higher Secondary School was established with a view to cater to the needs of the people in the low rung of the society. It received permanent recognition in 1947 and was upgraded to higher secondary in 1978.

See also

 List of Jesuit schools
 List of schools in Tamil Nadu

References

Jesuit secondary schools in India
Boys' schools in India
Christian schools in Tamil Nadu
High schools and secondary schools in Tamil Nadu
Education in Sivaganga district
Educational institutions established in 1943
1943 establishments in India